Run is the sixth studio album from contemporary Christian music band Sanctus Real. It was released on February 5, 2013 via Sparrow Records. In addition, the album producers are Jason Ingram, Seth Mosley and Christopher Stevens. The album has already garnered acclaim from the reviewers and has already achieved success from the lead single "Promises" on the charts. Furthermore, the album charted on the Billboard 200 and Billboard Christian Albums charts at Nos. 112 and 6 respectively in the debut week of February 23, 2013.

Background

Methodology and concentration 
Sanctus Real gave an interview to Worship Leader and were asked "How is your approach and focus different this time around in your new record, RUN?"

Title significance 

Sanctus Real was asked the question in the same interview with Worship Leader that "What is the meaning of your album title, RUN? What do you hope to convey to long-time fans as well as new listeners?"

Others involvement 

Sanctus Real was asked the question in the same interview with Worship Leader that "How have Chris Stevens (TobyMac), Jason Ingram (Brandon Heath), and Seth Mosley (Newsboys) working together as producers on your album RUN reshaped your sound and voice as a band?"

Critical reception

Run has achieved "universal acclaim" by the critics, and has received all but one positive or favorable review, which the lone dissent is from Jesus Freak Hideout's second staff opinion who gave it a mixed rating at that.

Run has been rated a four-and-a-half-stars-out-of-five by the following publications: About.com, Christian Music Zine, CM Addict New Release Tuesday's Sarah Fine and Worship Leader. About.com's Kim Jones illustrated how "Run kind of sneaks up on you. At first listen, it sounds pretty good but not really earth-shattering. The second listen is when the lyrics really start to hit home and by the third listen, you're in awe because it all falls into place." Joshua Andre of Christian Music Zine proclaimed "this album is one of their best." CM Addict's Andrew Funderburk praised "This album was nothing short of encouraging listeners to keep the pace in our faith." Sarah Fine of New Release Tuesday called Run "a powerful project that shows an incredible maturity in the band's style and songwriting." To this, Fine trumpeted that the band "Never shying away from hard topics, this album offers authenticity with a shimmering glimmer of hope in each song, making it one of the 'must-own' albums of 2013. I applaud the band on their desire to write music that ignores popular trends and focuses more on touching the hearts of people. With Run, they've absolutely accomplished that." Andy Joy of Worship Leader espoused "From start to finish, Run is full of energy, both lyrically and musically.  Both the lyrics and music are upbeat and uplifting quite literally: every chorus on the record begins with a major chord.  Rather than a weakness, Run’s song structure actually gives the record a feeling of completeness. Paired with singer Matt Hammitt’s lyrics, the songs feel wonderfully authentic. Behind the catchy melodies and big electric guitars, Run feels like the work of seasoned songwriters with years of life experience writing their personal prayers into the lyrics of each song."

The album got four-stars-out-of-five from the following publications: CCM Magazine, Indie Vision Music, Jesus Freak Hideout's John Choquette, Louder Than the Music and New Release Tuesday's Mary Burklin. Andy Argyrakis of CCM Magazine evoked how the album "seek[s] to encourage listeners going through a test of any nature with encouraging, empathetic lyrics of healing and hope." Jonathan Andre of Indie Vision Music promoted it as "a poetic and compelling album." Jesus Freak Hideout's John "Flip" Choquette noted that "While the band has successfully transformed their sound into a sugary, pop-covered sheen, the lack of musical experimentation sometimes leaves songs sounding too similar and making it difficult to distinguish one from another." On the other hand, Choquette wrote that "Enter Run, the band's most radio-friendly release yet, filled with some of the most honest, heartfelt lyrics Sanctus Real has ever written...While Fight the Tide might have been Sanctus Real's best rock release, Run may be just the beginning of a promising new direction." Louder Than the Music's Jono Davies embraced it as a "solid album" that "the best part is actually the themes running through it." In addition, Davies surmised that "The music is solid, the vocals are solid, but most of all - the lyrics are true and honest about who God is and what He has done for us." New Release Tuesday's Mary Burklin foretold that "Run is an intensely hopeful album that captures joy in musical form without oversimplifying the truths it presents. Matt Hammitt's gentle but soaring vocals are stronger than ever, carrying the songs over the more pop-oriented guitar beds laid down by guitarists Chris Rohman and Pete Prevost. This album is diverse enough to stay interesting through the 12-track standard length, but still musically grounded and cohesive. The songs shine as gentle reminders of hope in a hurting world, with every layer of each song saturated by grace."

Furthermore,  AllMusic's James Christopher Monger vowing that Run "leans harder on the pop side of the spectrum, offering up 11 potential singles that blend soaring melodies with inspirational lyrics that, for the most part, manage to steer clear of cliché. Honest, heartfelt, and engaging, and boasting more than a handful of standout cuts". Jonathan Faulkner of Alt Rock Live gave the album an eight-out-of-ten-stars, and noted that "It’s no surprise that Sanctus Real has put out another beautifully crafted album. The band keeps getting better with age, making it more and more exciting to hear what they will put out next." Graeme Crawford of Cross Rhythms rated the album a seven-stars-out-of-ten, and noted that "Opinion seems to be divided over 'Run', as some see it as a tremendous and vital album, while others view it more as a sign of the descent of Christian rock bands into the dark realms of commercialism and style over substance. It certainly has a highly polished production and more than a hint of radio-friendliness, but it is also engaging and uplifting. Sanctus Real are not breaking any new ground by any means, but there is that sort of familiar comfort that you get from slipping into a favourite jumper."

The lone mixed review came from Alex "Tincan" Caldwell of Jesus Freak Hideout, who rated the album two-and-a-half-out-of-five-stars, and highlighted that the two highlight's from the album are "Nothing Between" and "Picture of Grace". However, Caldwell wrote that "Those tunes are unfortunately among Runs few highlights. The bevy of similar sounding, though watered down, tunes that remain--with unimaginative titles like 'Pray,' 'Promises,' 'That's Life' and 'We Will Never Give Up'--sound like crowd-sourced greeting card sentiments with middle-of-the-road pop rock backdrops. Sanctus Real has demonstrated in the past that they are capable of writing hooky, yet thought-provoking songs with heart, and with almost three years between albums, it seems like Matt Hammitt and company could have come up with a lot more to say than is evidenced on Run."

 Commercial performance 
On February 23, 2013, Billboard magazine confirmed that Run was the sixth most sold Christian album via the Christian Albums chart. In addition, the album was the 112th most popular in the United States that same week and that is evidenced by the Billboard 200 charting.

 Track listing 

 Personnel Sanctus Real Matt Hammitt – vocals 
 Pete Prevost – keyboards, guitars, banjo
 Chris Rohman – guitars 
 Dan Gartley – bass 
 Mark Graalman – drums Additional musicians'
 Jason Ingram – programming, backing vocals 
 Tim Lauer – keyboards, programming 
 Seth Mosley – keyboards, programming, guitars, backing vocals 
 Jonathan Smith – programming, mandolin
 Christopher Stevens – keyboards, programming 
 Joe Williams – programming, backing vocals 
 Vince DiCarlo – backing vocals 
 Micah Kuiper – backing vocals 
 Alan Thomas – backing vocals

Charts

Album

References

External links 
 Sanctus Real: Picking up the Pace by Caroline Lusk CCM Magazine story

2013 albums
Sanctus Real albums
Sparrow Records albums
Contemporary Christian music albums by American artists